The West Indies cricket team toured England to play three Test matches. The team were originally scheduled to tour the country in May and June 2020. However, the series was initially postponed due to the COVID-19 pandemic. Cricket West Indies stated that they would do everything they can to help accommodate the fixtures, including moving the fixtures back or even hosting them in the West Indies. A revised tour schedule, with the first Test starting in July, was proposed at the end of May 2020. The fixtures were confirmed the following month, with the matches all played behind closed doors. The Test series formed part of the inaugural 2019–2021 ICC World Test Championship.

The series was played for the Wisden Trophy. Ahead of the third Test, the England and Wales Cricket Board (ECB) and Cricket West Indies (CWI) agreed to retire the trophy following the conclusion of the series. It was replaced with the Richards–Botham Trophy, in honour of Sir Viv Richards and Sir Ian Botham.

On the morning of the fifth and final day of the third Test, England's Stuart Broad became the seventh bowler to take 500 wickets in Test cricket, after dismissing Kraigg Brathwaite. Broad was the fourth fast bowler, and second bowler for England after James Anderson, to reach the milestone. England lost the first Test of the series, but won the remaining two matches, to win the series 2–1, and regain the Wisden Trophy. It was the first time since 1888 that England had won a three-match Test series at home after losing the opening match.

Background
The England and Wales Cricket Board (ECB) announced that no professional matches would take place before 28 May 2020 due to the pandemic. In April 2020, Ashley Giles, the director of cricket, said that hosting the Test matches in June was looking "less and less likely", but that "everything is on the table" with regards to England's schedule in 2020. On 24 April 2020, the ECB confirmed that no professional cricket would be played in England before 1 July 2020, with the tour being postponed. After the tour was postponed, both cricket boards had been involved in "positive" talks about rescheduling the series. This included the possibility of the West Indies team going into isolation for 14 days, and the first Test match starting on 8 July 2020. The ECB were also looking at hosting the Test matches in bio-secure environments, with Old Trafford in Manchester and the Rose Bowl in Southampton being possible venues, due to their hotel facilities.

On 13 May 2020, Johnny Grave, the chief executive of Cricket West Indies, said that he was hopeful that the tour would go ahead, but that players would be "very nervous" about travelling. The next day, the ECB confirmed that England players would return to training in the following week. Grave also confirmed that thirty players had been identified for preparation for the tour, with the West Indies' Test captain Jason Holder saying that no-one would be forced to travel, with safety being the priority. In late May 2020, a revised schedule was issued, with the final Test match taking place at Old Trafford in late July 2020. Grave also revealed details of a tentative tour itinerary, with the first Test starting on 8 July 2020 at the Rose Bowl in Southampton. The same week, the UK government published updated guidance on the resumption of training for elite sports. The West Indies also resumed training, with small groups taking part in on-field sessions at the Kensington Oval in Barbados. Cricket West Indies gave its approval "in principle" of touring England. On 2 June 2020, the ECB confirmed the dates and venues for the three-match series.

On 29 May 2020, the ECB named a 55-man group of players to begin training ahead of international fixtures starting in England. On 17 June 2020, this was trimmed down to a 30-man squad to prepare behind closed doors for the Test matches. England and the West Indies played intra-squad warm-up matches in Southampton and Manchester respectively prior to the Test series. On 3 June 2020, Cricket West Indies named a 14-man squad, along with eleven reserve players for the Test series. Darren Bravo, Shimron Hetmyer and Keemo Paul decided against travelling to England, due to coronavirus fears, and the length of time they could be away from their families. On 8 June 2020, the squad flew out from Antigua, arriving at Manchester Airport the following morning. After arrival, Jason Holder said that the players feel safe and that people "were crying out for cricket".

In June 2020, the International Cricket Council (ICC) made several interim changes to the Playing Conditions due to the pandemic. A substitute could be used for any player showing symptoms of COVID-19, but only in a Test match. Players were banned from using saliva to shine the ball, with five penalty runs being awarded to the opposition for repeated transgressions. The requirement to use neutral match officials was temporarily lifted, along with an increase to the number of DRS reviews a team can use, due to having less experienced umpires in a match. Michael Gough, Richard Illingworth and Richard Kettleborough were named as the on-field umpires for the Test matches, with Alex Wharf named as the fourth umpire. The last English umpire to stand in a home Test match was Peter Willey in the fifth Ashes Test in August 2001. The last time two English umpires stood in the same Test match in England was for the sixth Ashes Test in August 1993, when Mervyn Kitchen and Barrie Meyer were the on-field umpires.

Squads

Cricket West Indies also named Sunil Ambris, Joshua Da Silva, Shannon Gabriel, Keon Harding, Kyle Mayers, Preston McSween, Marquino Mindley, Shayne Moseley, Anderson Phillip, Oshane Thomas and Jomel Warrican as reserve players for the Test series. Following the conclusion of their practice matches, Shannon Gabriel was added to the West Indies' Test squad.

England captain Joe Root missed the first Test match to be at the birth of his second child, with Ben Stokes captaining England in his absence. Prior to being named captain, Stokes had never led a side in a first-class, List A or Twenty20 cricket match. On 4 July 2020, England named a thirteen-man squad for the first Test with James Bracey, Sam Curran, Ben Foakes, Dan Lawrence, Jack Leach, Saqib Mahmood, Craig Overton, Ollie Robinson and Olly Stone also named as reserve players. Some of the cricketers not selected for the Test matches from the initial 30-man squad began preparing for the One Day International (ODI) matches against Ireland.

Joe Root returned to the squad for the second Test, with James Anderson and Mark Wood both being rested. Sam Curran and Ollie Robinson were named in England's squad for the second Test, with Robinson getting his maiden call-up to the senior team. On the morning of the second Test, Jofra Archer was dropped from England's squad for the fixture, after he breached biosecurity protocols. As a result, he was placed in isolation for five days, fined, and given a written warning by the ECB.

Practice matches
The West Indies were due to play three tour matches, one each against England Lions, Worcestershire, and Northamptonshire. However, the tour matches were cancelled due to the COVID-19 pandemic. Instead, the 25-man touring squad played two intra-squad matches, serving as preparation. The squad was split into two teams, with one team being captained by Kraigg Brathwaite and the other being captained by Jason Holder. The teams were named after their respective captains. Initially, the second match was to have first-class status. However, the plan for this was changed after no play was possible on the first day of the fixture, allowing the West Indies to utilise all 25 players in their squad.

England also played an intra-squad match as warm-up, which started on 1 July 2020 at the Rose Bowl. England's squad was also split into two teams, with Ben Stokes captaining one side, and Jos Buttler captaining the other.

Test series

1st Test

2nd Test

3rd Test

Notes

References

External links
 Series home at ESPN Cricinfo

2020 in West Indian cricket
2020 in English cricket
International cricket competitions in 2020
2020
Cricket events postponed due to the COVID-19 pandemic